{{DISPLAYTITLE:C6H18N4}}
The molecular formula C6H18N4 may refer to:

 Triethylenetetramine, an organic compound with the formula [CH2NHCH2CH2NH2]2
 Tris(2-aminoethyl)amine, the organic compound with the formula N(CH2CH2NH2)3